Padang Besar–Sadao Highway (Highway 4054) is a major highway in Songkhla Province of Thailand. The highway also goes to the Malaysia-Thailand border and it becomes Malaysia Federal Route 7.

List of Junctions and Towns

References

National highways in Thailand